William Harris Douglas (December 5, 1853 – January 27, 1944) was a U.S. Representative from New York.

Biography
Born in New York City, Douglas attended private schools and the College of the City of New York.
He entered the exporting and importing trade.

Douglas was elected as a Republican to the Fifty-seventh and Fifty-eighth Congresses (March 4, 1901 – March 3, 1905).
He declined to be a candidate for renomination in 1904.
He resumed his former business pursuits.
He served as delegate to the Republican National Conventions in 1908, 1912, and 1916.
He died in New York City on January 27, 1944, and was interred in Sleepy Hollow Cemetery, Tarrytown, New York.

References

External links 
 

1853 births
1944 deaths
20th-century American politicians
Politicians from New York City
Burials at Sleepy Hollow Cemetery
Republican Party members of the United States House of Representatives from New York (state)
City College of New York alumni